David Kerr (born 3 September 1967) is a British film and television director. His debut feature film, Johnny English Strikes Again, was released internationally by Focus Features and Universal Pictures in 2018. David has a long track record as a pilot/lead director of award-winning TV comedy and drama, which includes No Offence, Inside No.9, Fresh Meat, Beautiful People and Whites.

Early life
Born in Belfast on 3 September 1967, he studied at Clare College, Cambridge and graduated (1989) with a First Class degree in Classics.

Career
He directs commercials through Hungry Man Productions. In 2015, his US gun control spot, "Playthings", won Best PSA at The AICP Show in New York.

David was presented with a British Academy Television Award for directing the first series of That Mitchell and Webb Look in 2006. He was nominated for another BAFTA for the second series in 2008.

In August 2017, he directed the spy comedy film Johnny English Strikes Again, which was released in 2018.

References

External links
 
 David Kerr at the British Film Institute.
 David Kerr at Hungry Man Productions.

1967 births
Living people
Male actors from Belfast
BAFTA winners (people)
Alumni of Clare College, Cambridge
British television directors
British film directors
British people of Irish descent
Year of birth missing (living people)